Mike David Ortmann (born 26 October 1999 in Brandenburg) is a German racing driver.

Career

Karting
Ortmann began karting in 2010 at the age of eleven, competing in championships across Germany and taking titles in the championship at East Saxon State and the East German ADAC Kart Cup in 2012.

Formula 4
In 2015, Ortmann graduated to single-seaters, partaking in the inaugural ADAC Formula 4 Championship with ADAC Berlin-Brandenburg e.V. He finished twelfth overall and finished as vice-champion in the rookie standings behind teammate David Beckmann.

He remained in the sport for the following season, taking three victories, a pole and a fastest lap to finish third in the championship.

ADAC GT Masters

Ortmann joined the 2017 ADAC GT Masters to drive an Audi R8 for Mücke Motorsport, partnering with Frank Stippler.

Racing record

Career summary

† As Ortmann was a guest driver, he was ineligible to score points.

Complete ADAC Formula 4 Championship results 
(key) (Races in bold indicate pole position) (Races in italics indicate fastest lap)

Complete ADAC GT4 Germany results
(key) (Races in bold indicate pole position) (Races in italics indicate fastest lap)

† As Ortmann was a guest driver, he was ineligible for points.

External links
 
 

1999 births
Living people
German racing drivers
ADAC Formula 4 drivers
24H Series drivers
Nürburgring 24 Hours drivers
ADAC GT Masters drivers
Italian F4 Championship drivers
Mücke Motorsport drivers
GT4 European Series drivers
Racing drivers from Brandenburg